Zhongfeng Mingben, 1263–1323 was a Chan Buddhist master who lived at the beginning of Yuan China. He adhered to the rigorous style of the Linji school and influenced Zen through several Japanese teachers who studied under him.

Biography
Zhongfeng Mingben's family name was Sun. He was the youngest of seven children. His mother died when he was nine years old. Already in his teenage years he wanted to become a monk. From fifteen he observed the layman's Five Precepts. His left hand became mutilated when, in his youth he burned the little finger as a sacrifice to the Buddha. This may have been inspired by chapter 23 of the Lotus Sutra:

In 1287 Zhongfeng Mingben received tonsure at Shiziyuan Monastery on Tianmu Mountain. In 1288 he was ordained as a monk. Contrary to the norm, he grew long hair in (presumed) accordance with his teacher, Gaofeng Yuanmai.

As a young man he was appointed to succeed the abbot of the monastery on Tianmu Mountain, but fled the monastery in a search for solitude.

As an adult he had an "overpowering physical build". He was called "The old Buddha south of the sea", an allusion to Mazu Daoyi, (709–788) one of the most influential teachers of Chan Buddhism, who lived during the Tang dynasty (618–907), the "golden age of Zen". Zhongfeng Mingben declined a number of titles, appointments and positions, temporarily choosing instead a life of wandering and solitary meditation. He turned down an invitation of Ayurbarwada Buyantu Khan to come to the Yuan court.

Teachings

Illusion
In Zhongfeng Mingben's Huanzhu Jiaxun, "Family instructions of Illusory Abiding", he describes himself as "the illusionary man", alluding to the play of Maya and the ability of tricksters to create an illusionary world. Zhongfeng Mingben states that this world is illusory, but that there is no alternative to this illusion. Students have to realize the pervasiveness of this illusion, and learn to act within it. The alternative for this illusionary or relative world, the absolute truth, is not to be regarded as an enduring phenomenon.

Zhongfeng Mingben relies on the Sutra of Perfect Enlightenment in his teachings on how to overcome this illusion. This sutra gives metaphors connected to illusion to explain the insubstantial nature of ignorance, such as dreams or flowers in the sky. Illusory phenomena emerge from an intrinsically pure ground. Since the illusions are not real in themselves, their disappearance will not change this pure ground. But the disappearance itself is also illusionary since the mind is enlightened or pure from the beginning. This makes it impossible to speak of either being enlightened or unenlightened, a position which is clearly at odds with basic Buddhist teachings. This is "cured" by overcoming "the discriminating thought processes that posit terms like illusion and real".

Physical practice
Illusion is also created by relying on words. There are alternative, non-discursive ways of relating to words, one of them being k'an-hua, "observing the key phrase", the method of kōan study introduced by Dahui Zonggao (1089–1163). Insight must be based in bodily experience rather than mere intellectual discrimination.

Another physical practice is calligraphy, the writing of characters. This writing is a bodily act. The writing of a character is not an intellectual inquiry, but "a performance of it". Zhongfeng Mingben was a celebrated calligraphy artist.

Pure Land
Zhongfeng Mingben merged Chán with Pure Land teachings. Together with Yongming Yanshou  (904–975), who lived three centuries earlier, he was an influential proponent of this dual practice.

Influence

Monastic discipline
Zhongfeng Mingben lived after the "golden age of Chán" of the Tang and the proliferation of Chán during the Tang. His age was regarded as an age of mofa ("Degenerate age of the Law"). Zhongfeng Mingben attributed this to a lack of monastic discipline and a lack of personal dedication by monks, and tried to counter this by writing a monastic code, the Huan-chu ch'ing-kuei (Jpn. Genju shingi), in 1317. This work influenced Musō Soseki, a contemporary of Zhongfeng Mingben, when he wrote his guidelines for monasteries and monks, the Rinsen kakun.

Gong-an

Zhongfeng Mingben was the first to compare the sayings and teachings of the 'masters of the old' with the public cases of the court, the gong-an.

According to Zhongfeng Mingben gōng'àn abbreviates gōngfǔ zhī àndú (公府之案牘, Japanese kōfu no antoku – literally the andu "official correspondence; documents; files" of a gongfu  "government post"), which referred to a "public record" or the "case records of a public law court" in Tang-dynasty China. Kōan/gong'an thus serves as a metaphor for principles of reality beyond the private opinion of one person, and a teacher may test the student's ability to recognize and understand that principle.

Japanese Zen

Several Japanese Buddhists came to China to study with Zhongfeng Mingben on Mount T'ien-mu. They formed the Genjū line of the Rinka monasteries, the more independent monasteries outside the cities and the Five Mountain System of government-approved temples. Kosen Ingen   was the most important of these Japanese students. Other students include Kohō Kakumyō, a teacher of Bassui Tokushō, and Jakushitsu Genkō (1290–1367), the founder of Eigen-ji.

Although they never met, Zhongfeng Mingben had a close affinity with Musō Soseki, via the Japanese students who studied with him.

Wild fox slobber
Hakuin's warning against "wild fox slobber" can be traced back to Zhongfeng Mingben. The term "wild fox" points to teachers who lead students astray by giving wrong information. The term wild fox is also the name of the Wild fox koan. Whereas Zhongfeng Mingben warns against the impossible attempt of totally silencing the mind, Hakuin uses the term in a more positive sense, to denote the workings of koans, which "possess the power to cause sudden death in students, raising the great doubt in their minds that will lead them to the 'great death' and the rebirth of satori and enlightenment".

Criticism
Zhongfeng Mingben's teachings mark the beginning of a development in Chinese Chán which made it vulnerable in the competition with other teachings:

This development left Chinese Chán vulnerable for criticisms by neo-Confucianism, which developed after the Song dynasty. Its anti-intellectual rhetoric was no match for the intellectual discourse of the neo-Confucianists.

Works
 Huanzhu Jiaxun, "The family instructions of "Illusory Abiding".
 Zhongfeng huai Qingtu shi, "Poem of Zhongfeng's love for the Pure Land".
 Admonition on filiality.
 Sanshi xinian, "Apprehending the thought [of Amithaba Buddha] within the Three Divisions of the Day".

 T'ien-mu Chung-feng Ho-shang Kuang-lu, "The Comprehensive Record of Chung-feng";  includes his writings and recorded sayings (goroku) compiled by Po-T'ing T'zu-chi for the last Yuan emperor, Shun-ti and presented in 1334.

Notes

References

Written references

Web references

Sources

Further reading

 
 
 

 

Chinese Zen Buddhists
Yuan dynasty people
People from Hangzhou
1263 births
1323 deaths